Barbara Ann Rosenthal (born 1948) is an American avant-garde artist, writer and performer. Her existential themes have contributed to contemporary art and philosophy. Her pseudonyms include "Homo Futurus," taken from the title of one of her books  and "Cassandra-on-the-Hudson,"  which alludes to "the dangerous world she envisions"  while creating art in her studio and residence, located since 1998 on the Hudson River in Greenwich Village, NYC. She successfully trademarked "Homo Futurus" in 2022.

Rosenthal is known as a conceptual artist. She often revisits past works, recombining old elements with new. Her archives have been accepted by Queens College. Her creative process may include the use of x-rays, brain scans and clothing. Sometimes, she utilizes physical or textual elements from her journals. As an artist within the fields of surrealism and existentialism, her works align with intense introspection, and by using herself "as a guinea pig", exploring what it means to be human.

As an artist, Rosenthal is known as an Old Master of New Media because of her long history in media, including photography, video, performance, projection installation, interactive, electronic and digital media, text, collage, prints, artists' books and objects. Almost all her works are produced in editions. Most combine camera, text, and performative aspects.  Elements of Rosenthal's previous body of work, "Surreal Photography" are often present.

Education and early career 
At age 11, Rosenthal was a weekly columnist for her town newspaper, The Franklin Square Bulletin.

Rosenthal attended the Brooklyn Museum Art School, studying figure drawing and painting with instructor Isaac Soyer. In 1962–64; she attended the Art Students' League, focusing on figure drawing and painting. During 1964-66, she studied Art History at New York University. She attended Carnegie-Mellon University and during her sophomore and senior years was editor of the literary-art magazine, Patterns. In 1968–69, she spent her junior year at Temple University/Tyler School of Art in Rome, Italy, studying art and art history. She received her BFA in painting from Carnegie-Mellon in 1970. She then attended The City University of New York/City College, for education and psychology in 1970–71; Seattle Pacific College, for media and education of the gifted in 1972–73; and received her MFA in painting at The City University of New York/Queens College in 1975.

During her years as an art student and teacher, Rosenthal supplemented her earnings as an assembly-line-painting artist; as a photojournalist stringer for The Village Voice, East Village Eye, and The New York Post; and as a go-go dancer at clubs including Metropole Cafe and Club Mardi Gras in Times Square, New York City. From 1972 to 1974, she taught printmaking and was director, set designer and lighting technician for several performances at the Lakeside School, a private high school in Seattle, Washington.

Teaching positions and other employment 
Rosenthal's first college teaching position was as a sabbatical replacement instructor of painting at Stephens College, Columbia, Missouri, in 1976–77. In 1982, with video pioneer Bill Creston, she founded eMediaLoft.org and .com.  Since 1990, Rosenthal has taught writing as an adjunct lecturer at the College of Staten Island of The City University of New York (CUNY/CSI). Rosenthal has also taught photography, video, multi-media, painting, drawing, design, crafts and art history at other colleges, including, among those in New York, The School of Visual Arts (SVA) and Parsons School of Design, where she was editor and producer of The College Council Faculty Affairs Newsletter. She also taught as an Adjunct Assistant Professor of Photography at SUNY/Nassau in 1994. She co-founded the Outrageous Consortium with filmmaker Margot Niederland in 2005; and founded The Museum of Modern Media in NYC, 2006.

Activism
In 1986, Rosenthal became an associate of the Women's Institute for Freedom of the Press (WIFP). WIFP is an American publishing NGO.

Writing 
As a writer, Barbara Rosenthal produces aphorisms, slogans, quips, poetry, stories, novels, text-based art, artist's books, pamphlets, art criticism, reviews and essays. Most of her aphorisms concern the nature of time and reality. They are issued as "Provocation Cards", which she hands out free in performance or on the street. Her fiction, like her visual art, presents a grim worldview, depicting surreal surroundings in which a lone individual faces incomprehensible situations.  Rosenthal is a regular contributor to NY Arts Magazine and is known for her principled stand against art as advocacy, which she labels "retrogarde". This sets her in opposition to many prevailing political, cultural and feminist trends in contemporary art.

In 1982 Rosenthal became an associate member of the Women's Institute For Freedom of the Press, Washington, DC.

Image and text art
Although Barbara Rosenthal's work is difficult to classify, it is usually described by categories of movement or media, even though many projects fuse elements from several: conceptual phretro-Gardesurreal photography, artists' books and objects, installation, performance, video, film, cartoons, text-based art, mail art, and writings (in all forms of literature and exposition).

One important series that appears in several forms is Homo Futurus, which comprises two artist's books of that title (one a blank book, eMediaLoft.org, 1984 and one with text and images, VSW Press, 1986), a wall work (shown at the Carlo Lamagna Gallery, 1987-88), and several print editions of various sizes. The purpose of this project has been described as lending insight into what makes us human, particularly in terms of ideals and values, and lending insight into the production of art, by citing information from the artist's own experience and practice, as well as from various news sources. Imagery consists of reproduced news photos and articles, postcards, and personal archival and family photographs, juxtaposed with Rosenthal's Surreal Photographs. Text is edited from Rosenthal's Journals.

One line in the offset book is "All history, documentation, journalism, diplomacy, thought, art, culture, etc., serve only to influence behavior of single individuals at single moments." Another is "The Flaw of the Ideal Is That It Does Not Encounter Time or Touch.".

These particular aphorisms, later designed as text-based art, also appear in Rosenthal's print suite Provocation Cards, first issued as an anonymous Mail Art series in 1989, later as a portion of her video-performance Lying Diary / Provocation Cards, 1990. These were later handed out during live performances called Existential Interacts, often incorporating Identity Theft Masks and Existential Button Pins. This interactive project, ongoing since 2005, has been produced in New York, 2005, Berlin, and Prague, London, Brussels and Paris. Enlarged Provocation Cards have also been hung as wall art at the Lucas Carrieri Gallery (Berlin, 2009). Each time, the text and the image of the text were increasingly refined.

Two folios of Provocation Cards Folio, with variation of configuration, and translation in English, German and French, are in the collection of the Tate Gallery, London.

An exhibition and book launch for her project Existential Cartoons, with drawing, photography and captions in English and Russian was held at The L Gallery for Contemporary Art in Moscow, June 2006

Performance 
Her performances frequently combine image, text, and video. Live performance, public appearances or even readings were rare for her until 2005 Her first performance/installation, "Self-Portrait Room", 1968, was not thought of as being in those genres at that time. Later, at the Tina B. Prague Contemporary Art Festival, October 2009, and again in 2010, she represented the United States in both Performance Art and Text-Based Art.

It is in the medium of Performance Art where Rosenthal's themes of individuality, human identity and time are shared with her viewers most directly. Her performances usually mix installation, projected photographic images, text, video, mediated voice, music, and abstract sound.

From 1976 to 1984, she performed in videos by placing a stationary camera in front of a single-action life situation. In 1984, she began staging such actions, although still for video, sometimes with other performers, sometimes cutting segments together, such as the 1984 piece Colors and Auras, with poet Hannah Weiner and Sena Clara Creston, age 2. Rosenthal's famous ventriloquism video of 1988, How Much Does The Monkey Count, was reprised in New York at CBGBs in 1991 and the Living Theater in 1992.

From 1976 to 1996, she was the principal female actor in Super-8 films by Bill Creston, also producing several, seven of which were screened at The Museum of Modern Art in 1989.

In 2005, Rosenthal crashed the Performa05 Festival in NY with Existential Interact wearing her image-text "Button Pin Shirts" and handing out Provocation Cards in front of the Guggenheim Museum and White Box Gallery in New York. This interaction (often also incorporating Identity Theft Masks was performed at various iconic street locations in New York[30,] Berlin[31], Prague[32], London, Brussels, Paris and Brisbane.

The 2011 performance art annual, Emergency Index contains a spread about this project.) In 2013, Rosenthal began experimenting with video morphs, and included this technique in performances of I’m Growing Up, at Grace Exhibition Space in Brooklyn, NY; and at AudioPollen in Brisbane, Australia. This project utilizes the Identity Theft Masks, but Rosenthal herself stands immobile as a white screen on which photographs of her own changing image are projected.

Photography

Photography is the medium that most expresses this artist's subconscious as she apprehends reality. Particularly in her Surreal Photography, ongoing since 1976, Barbara Rosenthal "depicts original perceptions that imply psychological narrative". The images induce "metaphors in a viewer's subconscious."

She uses Olympus OM-1 35mm analog cameras to captures full-frame images. Until 2005 she shot only in black and white, which she hand-processed and printed in her darkroom. Since 2006, she also shoots color film. She has continued to hand-process black and white film, sending the color film to a commercial lab, but scans and digitally prints both types of negatives.

Of all her working styles and genres, her photographs are most readily shown in art galleries. In the past few years, she has had solo or two-person photography shows in Peanut Underground, NYC (2013); Studio Baustelle, Berlin (2013); Visual Voice Gallery, Montreal (2012); and Galerie Glass, Berlin (2011). As with all her media, she works in several forms. Her Surreal Photography retains its full-frame rectangle. It comprises categories she calls Free Birds, Renegade Horses, Trapped Figures, Tiny Houses, Strange Neighborhoods, Aberrant Trees, Dangerous Forests, Sinister Landscapes, Eerie Locations, and Dark Continents. About 200 of her Surreal Photographs have been published by Visual Studies Workshop Press in her offset books. From 1978 to 1988, she also worked as a photojournalist at New York newspapers including The New York Post and the Village Voice.

Video
Since 1976, Barbara Rosenthal has made over 100 videos. She has worked in all formats as the technology has changed. These include 1/2" open reel, 3/4-Umatic, VHS, mini-DV and HD. As in all the media she employs, her video is "an investigation into the nature of individuality and its covalent relationships with language and culture."

Formally, Rosenthal's work uses devices such as disruption, rhythm, repetition, manipulation of sequencing and audio tracks, decrease of interval, divisions on the screen, presentations of tension and release, relentlessness and endurance, which Australian art historian Barb Bolt refers to as Rosenthal's "choreography."

The first works, The Haircut and The Bath began with 1/2" open reel portapak partnering with Bill Creston. In 1982, she won a Festival Prize for Helen Webster: Cancer and Self-Discovery at the Global Village Video Festival in New York. In 1988, her videos Leah Gluck: Victim of the Twins Experiments and Women in the Camps were shown in installation at The Jewish Museum, New York.

Although all Rosenthal's work is presented in a straightforward manner, her video is the most deceptively simple. The videos are often very brief, and like her other works, consist of text (sometimes onscreen, and sometimes in a title pun) and/or performance and/or single-shot surreal photography, or straight-on cinematography. These images and texts come directly from observation of a real phenomenon often shot in the course of her real life. Then, if a more profound significance becomes apparent to her, they are presented without adulteration or commentary, either with or without juxtaposition of related footage to reveal a personal vision that is often considered political.

It is this simple exposure of real, extant phenomenon, without "artistic" additions, that reveals her world view, which often seems bleak. Nevertheless, much of it contains wry humor. It is often honed and remade, with sections added and refined over the years. One such video is Dead Heat, which premiered at her mini-retrospective at The Directors Lounge in Berlin, June 25, 2009. It is a three-minute piece consisting of four horizontal split-screen segments which were shot in different video gauges between 1987 and 2009. In each segment, a figure transverses the screen, apparently in real time, from left to right: a bird, a horse, herself, a ship. But because each takes its own time, Rosenthal repeats the transverse crossing, so they lap each other. But she has mathematically tweaked the timing, so that each figure enters the screen on frame one and leaves the screen on the final frame, simultaneously. The bird, being the fastest, repeats the traverse many times, and the ship (which was shot from her window on the Hudson), only once. The horse (ridden by one of her children across the cornfield of one of her friends) and herself (in a park in Berlin) cross at their own speed. The title, Dead Heat, is an American pun that means a tied race, so, upon analysis, it can be understood to mean that our lives as individuals might be lived according to our own natures, but we all begin with the same first step, and we all end, together, in death.

Despite the seriousness of her themes, most videos are presented through an absurdist perspective, revealing the difficulty of true human communication. Nevertheless, her work forces an attempt "to understand our entire species."

Many of her early videos are receiving current attention. Ola Writes the Alphabet 1982, made with her daughter at age 3, was shown for several weeks in installation at the Stefan Stux Gallery, New York, August–September, 2013. Also in September, 2013, her 1979 piece, Pregnancy Dreams / Priming a Wall was revived by XFR-STN, the Transfer Station project at The New Museum in New York. In both segments Rosenthal is nude and 9-months pregnant. In the first part, a black and white stationary camera records her painting a wall during a radio broadcast; and in the second part, a transfer of Super-8 color film shot by Bill Creston, she reads scatological dreams from her Journal. This piece had received intense approbation when it premièred in 1980 at BACA Brooklyn Art and Culture Association, but is now acclaimed.

Several of her videos also depict or include the Journal, including January 10, 1986.

Besides partnering in New York and Missouri with Bill Creston in her early videos, as well as his films, she has partnered in Berlin, Germany with DJ RoBeat for several of her videos and live performances since 2008.

Art philosophy
In a videotaped 1992 panel discussion with critic Ellen Handy about art-making at The Gallery Of Contemporary Art in Fairfield, Connecticut, she enumerated many "dictums that guide [her] production: that pattern serve as color; that as few materials are used as possible; that as little space is used as possible; that there be no embellishment or superfluous element of design; that a work be visible and present new elements at every distance; that it engage a viewer differently from separate vantages; that it reach several centers of the psyche simultaneously; so a viewer is left room to freely associate; that mystery is always present; that it does not advocate; that it does not mimic past successes; that it can maintain its veracity in an imaginary room of great works; that it be available to everyone and that it be both produced and priced at lowest possible cost."

In 2013, Rosenthal gave lectures in Melbourne, Australia at Monash University and Victorian College of the Arts entitled "Authenticity in Art" and "The Medium is NOT the Message". She said that originality should be prized, and artists not adopt anyone else's style; that "art expresses an individual's world view"; that an artist must mine their own observations and "produce work from their own soul and psyche," which is the title of her 1996 book. She also insists that content, not form or medium is what ultimately communicates a work of art, but that the work not be an illustration of an already understood empiricism, but a search toward one that can ultimately be apprehended, but is still not conscious within the artist until after the work is produced.

Her methodology is that noting events in her Journal leads to insights which lead to ideas. She uses materials and people from her real life.

Recent solo exhibitions
Recent solo exhibitions include the following:
"Barbara Rosenthal: Authenticity in Art", Monash University, Melbourne, Australia, Oct., 2013 
"Barbara Rosenthal: The Medium is NOT the Message", Art Forum/Victorian College of the Arts, Melbourne, Australia, Sept., 2013 
"Barbara Rosenthal: Existential Interact with Provocation Cards" and "The Secret of Life and Other Shorts", Peanut Underground Art Projects, New York, NY, Aug. 2013 
"Barbara Rosenthal – Existential Interact, Paris", Esplenade du Trocadéro, Paris, France, Feb. 2013 
"Barbara Rosenthal – Existential Word Play", Studio Baustelle, Berlin, Germany, Feb. 2013 
"Barbara Rosenthal – Mini Video Retrospective: Existential Word Play", Millennium Film Workshop, New York, NY, Jan 2013 
"Barbara Rosenthal – Surreal Photography: Trapped Figures and Tiny Houses", Visual Voice Gallery, Montreal, Canada, Nov. 2012  
"Barbara Rosenthal – Existential Word Play", Montreal Art Centre, Montreal, Canada, Nov. 2012*
Decade Of Madness: Barbara Rosenthal – Photo Projections & Reading", Fourth Street Photo Gallery, New York, NY, 2012
"Barbara Rosenthal With DJ RoBeat On Stage", Joe's Bar, Berlin, Germany, 2011 
"Barbara Rosenthal Filmabend", Galerie Glass, Berlin, Germany, Aug. 2012 
"Journal Into Art: Barbara Rosenthal – Reading With Projections", Central Booking Artspace, Brooklyn, NY, 2012  
"Barbara Rosenthal – Das Tagebuch gibt mir Ideen, Lettrétage: Das junge Literaturhaus, Berlin, Germany, 2011 
"Barbara Rosenthal – Flying Objects, Photographs & Videos, Morgenvogel Gallery, Berlin, Germany, 2011 
"Barbara Rosenthal – Existential Interact, Grand'Place, Brussels, Belgium, 2010
"Barbara Rosenthal – Summer Solstice Mask Performance, Stonehendge, UK, 2010 
"Barbara Rosenthal – Video Poetry, Lettrétage: Das junge Literaturhaus, Berlin, Germany, 2010 
"Barbara Rosenthal: Existential Wall Works, Photography, Drawing and Performance", Lucas Carrieri Gallery, Berlin, Germany, June 26, 2009.
"Barbara Rosenthal - 33 Existential Videos", Directors Lounge, Berlin, Germany, June 25, 2009.
"Existential Interact", a series of street performances in front of KW Kunst-Werke Institute for Contemporary Art during the Wooloo Berlin New Life Festival in Berlin, Germany, June, 2008.
"Existential Cartoons", an exhibition of digital prints, DVD projections and animated cartoons at the L-Gallery of Contemporary Art, Moscow, Russia, June, 2007.
"Barbara Rosenthal Contemplates Suicide," a Bathroom Installation of printed and sewn objects, button pins, and video at the Pool Art Fair, Chelsea Hotel, NYC, Oct., 2006.
"Devolution of Self", an exhibition of digital prints on mylar, roped to ceiling, floor and each other, at the Pickled Art Centre, Beijing, China, June, 2006.
Rosenthal's group shows include venues such as Jewish Museum (New York), and the Stenersenmuseet Museum, Oslo, Norway.

Major collections
The largest holdings of Rosenthal's works in Europe are at Artpool Art Research Center, and the Tate Britain Library, London, England. The largest American holdings of her work are in The Dadabase Collection of The Museum of Modern Art and The Whitney Museum of American Art. Her archives, including over one hundred volumes of workbooks and Journals, and fifty drafts of her unpublished novel, "Wish For Amnesia", are currently housed at eMediaLoft.org, NYC, and bequeathed to the Special Collections of the Hunt Library at Carnegie-Mellon University, upon her death.

Grants, honors, awards 
In 2013, Barbara Rosenthal received participation in the New Museum's XFR-STN Transfer Station media archiving project.

In 2006, Rosenthal received an Artist's Residency from the Red Gate Gallery, Beijing This follows residencies in 2000 at Visual Studies Workshop Press, Rochester, NY; an Amiga Computer Video Imaging Residency Grant at Adaptors/Brooklyn, NY, in 1996; three Electronic Arts Grant Video Residency, Experimental TV Center, Owego, NY in 1989, 90 and 91; a Harvestworks Audio-Video Residency, NYC in 1988 and a Video Arts Residency at Real Art Ways, Hartford, CT in 1988.

Monetary awards have included a Media Presentation Grant from Experimental TV Center, Owego, NY in 2000; Finishing Funds from Film Bureau in NYC 1991; a New York State Council on the Arts Video Facility Subsidy Grant at Margolis/Brown Adaptors, Brooklyn, NY in 1998; a Finishing Funds Grant from Media Bureau/The Kitchen in NYC, in 1988; three Artists Space/Artists Grants in NYC 1986, 89 and 90; and a Creative Arts for Public Service C.A.P.S. Grant in Video, New York State, in 1984.

Rosenthal received a Medal of Honor from the Brussels Ministry of Culture, Brussels, Belgium, in 1990; Rosenthal received a Global Village Documentary Festival Award in NYC, 1983; listing as a Fiction Writer, Poet, and Spoken Word Artist by Poets & Writers, NYC, since 1986; and elected membership in Pi Delta Epsilon National Publications Honor Society, USA, in 1970.

Selected works

Books
Clues to Myself, Visual Studies Workshop Press, Rochester, NY, 1981 
Homo Futurus, Visual Studies Workshop Press, Rochester, NY, 1986 
Sensations, Visual Studies Workshop Press, Rochester, NY, 1984 
Soul & Psyche, Visual Studies Workshop Press, Rochester, NY, 1998 
Weeks, (collaboration with poet Hannah Weiner), Xexoxial Endarchy, Madison, WI, 1990

Pamphlets and saddle-stitched books
Existential Cartoons, L-Gallery of Contemporary Art, Moscow, Russia, 2007
Catalogue Raisonné, The Museum of Modern Media, NYC, 2007
Children's Shoes, eMediaLoft.org, NYC, 1992
Introduction to the Trilogy, eMediaLoft.org, NYC, 1985
Names/Lives, eMediaLoft.org, NYC, 2001
Old Address Book, eMediaLoft.org, N.Y.C., 1984
Structure And Meaning, eMediaLoft.org, NYC, 1981

References

Further reading 

Boyle, Deirdre, "Video Playback: Less is More, and Other Video Verities" "Sightlines", Summer 1982
Coleman, A.D.,"Revising Revisionism: Footnotes to the Current Fantasy", Center Quarterly, Woodstock, NY, Winter 1985-86
Dargis, Manohla, "Countercurrents: Change of Direction", Village Voice, New York, NY, August 16, 1988
Handy, Ellen, "Passing Moments, Memory Traces and Light Images", Photography Quarterly, Woodstock, NY, Spring 1995
Handy, Ellen, "Time and Memory: The Limits of Photography", Center Photography Quarterly, Woodstock, NY, 1994
Handy, Ellen, "Time and Memory, Video Art and Identity", Catalogue, The Jewish Museum, New York, NY, 1988
Hoffberg, Judith, Review of "Button Pins: Nice", Umbrella Magazine Los Angeles, CA, 1995
Hoffberg, Judith A., "Three From Barbara Rosenthal", Umbrella, Santa Monica, CA, 2000
Hoffberg, Judith A., "Reviews: One 4-Word Book/Four 1-Word Books", Umbrella, Santa Monica, CA, 1995
Lieberman, Laura C., "Once Is Not Enough", Afterimage, Rochester, NY, Fall, 1990
Mersereau, Davis, "Feed Your Brain, But Trust It", The Art of Connecting, Online, April, 2012
Morgan, Robert C., "Art: Structure, Repetition and 'The Body", Cover, New York, NY, April 1994
Myers, George, Jr., "Cretan Bull Dancers: Carolee Schneemann, Terry Kennedy, Irene Siegel, Linda Montano & Barbara Rosenthal," Introduction to Modern Times, Lunchroom Press, East Lansing, MI, 1982
Sorgatz, Michael, "Profile Barbara Rosenthal", Art in New York City", Online, February, 2012
Spector, Buzz, "Artists' Writings," Art Journal, New York, NY, Fall, 1990
Werter, Marta L. "Hannah Weiner's ‘The Book Of Revelations’", Jacket2, Philadelphia, Pennsylvania, 2011

External links
Official site

1948 births
Living people
American conceptual artists
Women conceptual artists
American diarists
American installation artists
American multimedia artists
American performance artists
American spoken word artists
American video artists
American women installation artists
American women novelists
American women performance artists
American women poets
American women short story writers
American women video artists
Artist authors
Book artists
New media artists
Women diarists
Artists from New York City
Photographers from New York (state)
People from the Bronx
College of Staten Island faculty
Seattle Pacific University alumni
20th-century American novelists
20th-century American short story writers
20th-century American photographers
21st-century American photographers
20th-century American poets
20th-century American women writers
Novelists from New York (state)
American women non-fiction writers
20th-century American non-fiction writers
20th-century American women photographers
21st-century American women photographers